Endless Summer is a compilation album by American rock band the Beach Boys, released on June 24, 1974. A collection of hits from the band's 1962–65 period, Endless Summer was compiled by their old label, Capitol Records, following the success of the film American Graffiti, in which several songs were featured. It revitalized the band's popularity after years of lukewarm sales, but also inspired nostalgia for the Beach Boys' early surfing and hot rod-themed music, repositioning the group as an oldies act.

Four months after its release, the album reached number 1 in the United States and Canada. It was the group's second chart-topping album in the US and returned them to a level of commercial success they had not experienced since the mid-1960s. The compilation spent 155 weeks on the Billboard albums chart and was certified 3× platinum by the RIAA for shipping over three million copies. Capitol released a second themed compilation in 1975 titled Spirit of America, which also sold well.

The album was included in Robert Christgau's "Basic Record Library" of 1950s and 1960s recordings, published in Christgau's Record Guide: Rock Albums of the Seventies (1981).
It was voted number 972 in the third edition of Colin Larkin's All Time Top 1000 Albums (2000).

Background
In 1992, Mike Love noted, "They were going to do a  Best Of The Beach Boys Volume Three  in 19- , whatever the hell it was, and I came in there and went, "Wait a second, call it Endless Summer, instead of being Volume Three which sound nauseating to me. Endless Summer has a whole other vibe to it and sold several million copies just with the switch of the title. But then I'm a title guy anyway."

Artwork
Initial pressings of this album contained a poster depicting an airplane flying a Beach Boys banner.  While the album is limited entirely to the band's 1960s material, the cover artwork reflected the Beach Boys' 1970s appearance. The artwork illustrator was Keith McConnell (who also did the artwork for their follow-ups, Spirit of America and Sunshine Dream). With vegetation in the foreground, it also seems to evoke images of the band's late 1960s Smiley Smile album, although none of the songs on the original pressing are from Smiley Smile. ("Good Vibrations" was added to the 1987 CD release of the album as a bonus track.)

Releases
Although originally released as a double album (two LPs in a gatefold sleeve) in the US, the album was released in the UK on a single LP with 10 songs on each side.

The records on the vinyl release were pressed with Sides 1 & 4 on one disc and Sides 2 & 3 on the other to accommodate record changers, which were widely popular in the 1970s. The cassette version differs slightly as to the sequence of tracks. Side 1 features all tracks from Sides 1 & 2 in the same order plus "I Get Around" from Side 3.  Side 2 includes the remaining tracks from Sides 3 & 4 in the same order with the exception of "Girls on the Beach" and "Wendy" which were 'swapped'.

The song "Help Me, Ronda," the version from the album The Beach Boys Today!, which was the one included in this album, was retitled "Help Me, Rhonda," like the hit single version. It was featured as one of two Beach Boys tracks in a promotional-only various artists compilation album issued by Capitol records entitled The Greatest Music Ever Sold (Capitol SPRO-8511/8512), that was distributed to record stores during the 1976 Holiday season as part of Capitol's "Greatest Music Ever Sold" campaign, which promoted 15 "Best Of" albums released by the record label. The song was once again retitled "Help Me, Rhonda," for this compilation album. "Dance, Dance, Dance" from Spirit of America was the other Beach Boys song to be included.

The audiophile reissue label DCC Compact Classics released its own Endless Summer CD in 1995. It was mastered by Steve Hoffman and contains the hit single versions of "Help Me, Rhonda" and "Be True to Your School" rather than the alternate album versions which appeared on the original release. It also retains the "Good Vibrations" bonus track from the 1987 Capitol CD.

Track listing
All songs written by Brian Wilson and Mike Love, except where noted.

Charts

Weekly charts

Year-end charts

Certifications

References

1974 greatest hits albums
The Beach Boys compilation albums
Capitol Records compilation albums
Albums produced by Brian Wilson
Albums produced by Nick Venet